ACTION (Australian Capital Territory Internal Omnibus Network) is a bus operator in Canberra, Australia, and is owned by the Government of the Australian Capital Territory.

History

	

On 19 July 1926, the Federal Capital Commission commenced operating public bus services between Eastlake (now Kingston) in the south and Ainslie in the north.

The service was first known as Canberra City Omnibus Service, but it has had a number of names over the years, including Canberra City Bus Service, Canberra Omnibus Service and Canberra Bus Service. On 14 February 1977, it was renamed as the Australian Capital Territory Internal Omnibus Network, or ACTION for short.

In 1976, Canberra became the first city in Australia to operate articulated buses after the purchase of 25 MAN SG192s. In May 1982, ACTION commenced operating the Canberra Explorer in a joint venture with Murrays.

As part of the move to ACT self-government, responsibility for ACTION passed from the Federal Government to the ACT Government in 1989. In 2001, ACTION became a statutory authority.

Network 2019
In June 2018, the ACT Government released a proposal for changes to the bus network to coincide with the opening of the Light Rail which included a 7-day network with 10 rapid routes and an overhaul of the route numbers. The proposed changes caused controversy due to changes to school services and the removal of all Xpresso services. Public consultation for the proposal lasted between June and August 2018 and a modified proposal was released in October 2018. The starting date of the new bus network was pushed back to 29 April 2019 due to delays on the construction of the Light Rail.

Corporate structure
ACTION is a business unit of the Public Transport Division of Transport Canberra & City Services. Transport Canberra was formed on 1 July 2016 by combining the Public Transport Division and Capital Metro Agency to manage all public transport operations within the ACT.

Current routes
ACTION operates a 7-day network of bus routes including nine main routes and 48 local routes.

R2
Route R2 is a limited stop service between Fraser, Kippax, Belconnen, City, Parkes, Barton and Iron Knob Street, Fyshwick (at the Canberra Outlet Centre).

It operates at a 15-minute frequency on weekdays and it operates at a 30-minute frequency on weekends and public holidays.

R3
Route R3 is a limited stop service between Spence, Belconnen, City, Russell Offices and Canberra Airport.

It operates at a 15-minute frequency on weekdays and it operates at a 30-minute frequency on weekends and public holidays.

R4
Route R4 services provide a high-frequency link between Belconnen, City, Woden and Tuggeranong.

It operates at a 5 to 10-minute frequency on weekdays and it operates at a 15-minute frequency on weekends and public holidays.

R5
Route R5 is a high-frequency link between the City, Woden, Erindale Centre, Calwell Centre and Lanyon Marketplace.

It operates at a 15-minute frequency on weekdays and it operates at a 30-minute frequency on weekends and public holidays.

R6
Route R6 is a high-frequency link between the City, Parkes, Barton, Kingston, Manuka, Narrabundah, the Canberra Hospital and Woden.

It operates at a 15-minute frequency on weekdays and it operates at a 30-minute frequency on weekends and public holidays.

R7
Route R7 is an express link between the City, Cooleman Court and Chapman.

It operates at a 15-minute frequency on weekdays and it operates at a 30-minute frequency on weekends and public holidays.

R8
Route R8 is a direct main route between the Gungahlin Town Centre and the bus stations at Belconnen.

It operates at a 15-minute frequency on weekdays and it operates at a 30-minute frequency on weekends and public holidays.

R9
Route R9 is an east-west link between Belconnen, Canberra Stadium, Dickson and Watson.

It operates at a 15-minute frequency on weekdays and it operates at a 30-minute frequency on weekends and public holidays.

R10
Route R10 is a direct link between Denman Prospect and the City.

It operates at a 30-minute frequency on weekdays, weekends and public holidays.

Regular route services
ACTION's regular weekday services operate either as feeder services to a single town centre or connect two or three town centres via suburban streets.

During weekends and public holidays, ACTION provides a reduced level of service with most suburban routes operating with an hourly or two-hourly frequency.

Other peak services
ACTION operates 3 weekday peak hour routes as an express service between outer suburbs of Tuggeranong and the City. These routes are numbered in the 100 series. 

ACTION is currently operating a shuttle bus loop service from Canberra Airport to the Fairbairn Business Park on a three month trial basis. The service operates from 7am until 10am in the morning and again from 4pm until 7pm in the afternoon on weekdays.

School services
School services are provided by ACTION to schools and colleges throughout the ACT. These are numbered in the 1000 and 2000 series.

Special needs transport
ACTION also operates the special needs transport division which provides transport for school students with a disability. This division is operated using a dedicated fleet of wheelchair-accessible minibuses.

Flexible bus service
The Flexible bus service operates on weekdays to provide a free, basic bus service to passengers with limited access to normal public transport options. Six services operate daily providing a pick up service in the morning from designated suburbs to shopping centres and hospitals, with return services operating in the afternoon.

These bus services are operated by the special needs transport minibuses.

Ticketing

Cash fares
There are four cash fare options on ACTION:
 Adult Single (with 90-minute transfer)
 Adult Daily
 Concession Single (with 90-minute transfer)
 Concession Daily

Concession tickets are available to school students, full-time tertiary students, seniors card holders and various government concession card holders.

Pre-paid fares

The pre-paid ticketing system operated by the ACT Government is known as MyWay. It uses contactless smart cards with MIFARE-Technology onto which credit is loaded. Passengers are required to 'tag on' when boarding the bus and 'tag off' when exiting, at which point the appropriate fare is calculated and, if required, deducted from the stored value on the MyWay card.

The MyWay system uses Parkeon software and equipment including Wayfarer 200 consoles and Axio card readers. The system was built and installed by Parkeon's Australian distributor, Downer EDi. Instead of being developed from scratch, MyWay was adapted from Transperth's SmartRider system which also uses Parkeon hardware and software.

Fleet
As at February 2023, ACTION's route service fleet consisted of 459 buses.

Bicycle racks have been fitted to the front of 94% of the buses in the fleet. Each rack can hold two bicycles. Passengers may load a bicycle onto the rack for free, but must pay a regular fare to travel on the bus.

Apart from buses with all over advertising or special designs, ACTION's fleet sport either a blue, orange and white (Renault buses) or a green, orange and white livery (all other buses). In December 2016, a predominantly blue livery was introduced.

ACTION's Special Needs Transport division operates a fleet of eighteen Mitsubishi Fuso Rosa minibuses. These buses are white in colour and do not operate on route services.

ACTION also operate Toyota Hiace Commuter and Hyundai iMax vans which can be used to transport passengers, Hino Dutro trucks used by mechanics to attend broken down buses and a single Mack tow truck.

ACTION's heritage fleet consists of a 1949 AEC Regal III and a 1961 AEC Reliance.

History
Until the mid-1970s, purchases mainly comprised heavyweight British built AEC and Leyland chassis before a switch was made to European chassis. In 1972, the first Volvo B58s were purchased. These were followed by MAN SL200s from 1975, articulated MAN SG192s from 1976, Mercedes-Benz O305s from 1981, articulated O305Gs from 1982, Renault PR100.2s from 1986, articulated Renault PR180.2s from 1988 and Renault PR100.3s from 1994. The Renaults were badged as Macks although they carried the Renault diamond badge.

Although primarily purchasing new buses, ACTION has on occasions purchased and hired second-hand buses. With industrial action in England causing a shortage of both chassis and parts at a time Canberra was undergoing phenomenal growth, in February 1974, 12 Leyland OPS2/1s were hired from the Public Transport Commission. In June 1974 the entire 10 bus fleet of Bedford, Ford and Thornycroft buses of recently ceased operator Bowden's Bus Service of Tamarama was purchased. A number of Bedfords and Fords were purchased from dealer's stock.

In 1997, 25 Wright Crusader bodied Dennis Darts were imported from Northern Ireland.

In 2001, 17 former North & Western Bus Lines Hino RG197Ks were leased from Sydney Buses for a short period. In February 2004, 20 Custom Coaches bodied Irisbus Agoras built for, but not delivered to King Brothers entered service.

Livery
Fleet livery was originally fawn with a yellow stripe. This was replaced by the 1960s by a coffee body with arctic green window area and red stripe. In 1973, a yellow body with arctic green window surrounds and light blue stripe livery was introduced. This was replaced in 2004 by the current white, green and orange livery.

Registrations
Initially buses were registered in the C**** series. By the 1960s, buses were registered as ZIB*** in the Commonwealth of Australia series. In May 1989, the fleet was reregistered onto ACT Government BUS*** plates.

Infrastructure

Depots

ACTION operates three depots:
Woden Bus Depot, Prospect Court, Phillip opened 16 April 1974, closing in February 1997 before reopening in 2009. It currently  houses the Special Needs Transport minibus fleet and buses which are not in service. Demolished in 2018 with a new depot built.
Belconnen Bus Depot, Cohen Street, Belconnen opened 3 September 1979,  includes a bus wash, workshop, undercover bus parking, diesel refill, drivers amenities and administrative area.
Tuggeranong Bus Depot, Scollay Street, Greenway opened in August 1989, includes a bus wash, workshop, undercover bus parking, CNG and diesel fuelling facilities, drivers amenities and administrative area.

Bus Stations

ACTION operates seven bus stations, which act as hubs for the districts of Canberra.

City Interchange (opened 23 November 1982 and remodelled 2000) serves Canberra Central, R2, R3, R4, R5, R6, R7 and R10 services. It provides interchange with light rail (R1)
Woden Interchange (opened 4 December 1972, second stage opened 1982) serves Woden Valley, Weston Creek, Tuggeranong, R4, R5 and R6 services
Tuggeranong Interchange (opened 12 August 1991) serves Tuggeranong and R4 services
Located in Belconnen Town Centre are three bus stations - Cohen Street (opened 2009) and Belconnen Community Station (opened November 2010) and Westfield Belconnen Station - which serve Belconnen, R2, R3, R4, R8 and R9 services
Gungahlin Town Centre - located on Gungahlin Place - serves Gungahlin and R8 services. It provides interchange with light rail (R1)

City Interchange is located on East Row, Mort Street and Alinga Street. Limited local access is permitted on Mort and Alinga Streets, while East Row is a bus-only street. Since April 2019, several major routes stop in the part of Aligna Street to the west of Northbourne Avenue, but it continued to be open to traffic until 26 July 2019. Woden and Tuggeranong Interchange are off street stations which permit access only to buses, essential traffic and emergency vehicles.

Belconnen Town Centre is serviced by two bus stations located along Cohen Street: Cohen Street Bus Station (located outside the Belconnen Bus Depot near the intersection with Josephson Street, opened in May 2009) and Belconnen Community Bus Station (located between Benjamin Way and Emu Bank, at the site of the former Belconnen Interchange, opened in November 2010). In addition, a major stop is located outside Westfield Belconnen, near the intersection of Cohen and Lathlain Streets. All bus routes travelling to or through Belconnen Town Centre service all three locations. Additional stops are located on Emu Bank and Eastern Valley Way which are serviced by most routes which travel through Belconnen Town Centre.

Bus shelters

Bus shelters installed at stops include what is referred to as a "concrete bunker" which were first installed in May 1975. More modern shelters include glass-sided Adshel shelters (both with and without advertising) which were first installed in 2007 and CAM (Community Asset Management NZ Limited) shelters which were first installed in 2012.

References

External links

ACTION homepage  

Bus companies of the Australian Capital Territory
Bus transport in Canberra
Government agencies of the Australian Capital Territory
Transport companies established in 1926
1926 establishments in Australia